Thomas Waern Gabrielsson (born 29 June 1963) is a Swedish actor, active in Sweden and Denmark.  He was born in Gothenburg.

Stage career
In 1998 Gabrielsson performed solo in the 70 minute monologue dramatisation of The Evil at the Theater La Balance in Vanløse.

Filmography (selected)
En Kærlighedshistorie (aka: Dogme # 21) (2001)
Rejseholdet (TV series) (2001–2002)
Rembrandt (2003)
Forsvar (TV series) (2003)
Ørnen (TV series) (2004)
Voksne Mennesker (2005)
Oskar og josefine (2005)
Wallander - Fotografen (TV series) (2006)
Nynne (TV series) (2006)
Hipp Hipp - Itzhaks Julevangelium (TV series) (2006)
Cecilie (2007)
POP (2007)
Arn – The Knight Templar (2007)
A Royal Affair (2012)
Tomgang (TV series) (2014)
The Last Kingdom (TV series) 2015
Domino (2019)

See also
List of Swedish actors

References

External links

1963 births
Living people
People from Gothenburg
Swedish male film actors
Swedish male stage actors
Swedish male television actors
20th-century Swedish male actors
21st-century Swedish male actors